Prakash Kumar Singh, is the Chairman of Steel Authority of India Limited, SAIL, one of the largest state-owned steel making company based in India and one of the major steel makers in world.

Career

P K Singh obtained his degree in Metallurgy from Indian Institute of Technology Roorkee. Singh joined SAIL, Bokaro Steel Plant in 1980.  

Regarded as an expert in blast furnace technology and operations, Singh has contributed many technical papers on emerging technologies and challenges in steel industry. .work at bokaro steel plant as general manager blast furnace( operation). 

Singh was Executive Director (Works) at Bhilai Steel Plant and prior to that he was Executive Director (Works) at IISCO Steel Plant.  Before taking charge as Chairman, SAIL in December 2015, Singh was the Chief Executive Officer of SAIL’s Durgapur Steel Plant and in July, 2015, he was also given the additional charge of CEO, IISCO Steel Plant.

Awards and recognition

He has been conferred with various awards viz. ‘Jawahar’ award for outstanding performance at ISP, Burnpur. ‘Industry Leader’ award conferred by Central Mechanical Engineering Research Institute, ‘Industry Leadership’ award conferred by the Institution of Engineers, Durgapur, ‘Best CEO’ award for the Eastern region conferred by the Quality Circle Forum of India, Durgapur Chapter.

References

External links
Prakash Kumar Singh

Indian business executives